Jozinei João Machado Rodriguez (born 14 June 1991 in Cuiabá), commonly known as Nei, is a Brazilian footballer for AD Fafe.

Career
Nei has played for Danubio F.C. in Uruguay and had a brief spell with Esporte Clube Noroeste in 2014. Nei played for Clube Esportivo Dom Bosco in the Campeonato Mato-Grossense before joining Serie D side CE Operário Várzea-Grandense in June 2015.

References

External links

1991 births
Living people
People from Cuiabá
Association football midfielders
Brazilian footballers
Brazilian expatriate footballers
Danubio F.C. players
Miramar Misiones players
Esporte Clube Noroeste players
Esporte Clube Guarani players
Esporte Clube Cruzeiro players
AD Fafe players
Campeonato de Portugal (league) players
Uruguayan Primera División players
Campeonato Brasileiro Série D players
Brazilian expatriate sportspeople in Uruguay
Brazilian expatriate sportspeople in Portugal
Expatriate footballers in Uruguay
Expatriate footballers in Portugal
Sportspeople from Mato Grosso